Ukrainurus is an extinct genus of pancryptobranchan urodelan known from the Miocene of Grytsiv locality, Ukraine. It contains a single species, Ukrainurus hypsognathus.

References 

Cenozoic salamanders
Miocene amphibians
Fossils of Ukraine
Fossil taxa described in 2013